Mount Van Buren is the prominent mountain 3 nautical miles (6 km) north-northwest of Mount Jackson, at the east side of the Dyer Plateau, Palmer Land. It was mapped by the United States Geological Survey (USGS) in 1974. The name was applied by the Advisory Committee on Antarctic Names (US-ACAN) in association with Mount Jackson. Martin Van Buren (1782–1862) was the eighth President of the United States, 1837–1841. He was Vice President, 1833–1837, during the second term of President Andrew Jackson.

Mountains of Palmer Land